The 1995 Hockey East Men's Ice Hockey Tournament was the 11th Tournament in the history of the conference. It was played between March 7 and March 18, 1995. Play-in and quarterfinal games were played at home team campus sites, while the final four games were, for the final time, played at the Boston Garden in Boston, Massachusetts, the home venue of the NHL's Boston Bruins. By winning the tournament, Boston University received the Hockey East's automatic bid to the 1995 NCAA Division I Men's Ice Hockey Tournament.

Format
The tournament featured three rounds of play with an additional play-in game with each round being a single-elimination game. The teams that finish eighth and ninth in the conference play a single play-in game to determine the final qualifier to the tournament. In the first round, the first seed and play-in victor, the second and seventh seeds, the third seed and sixth seeds, and the fourth seed and fifth seeds played with the winners advancing to the semifinals. In the semifinals, the highest and lowest seeds and second highest and second lowest seeds play with the winners advancing to the championship game and the losers meeting in a consolation game. The tournament champion receives an automatic bid to the 1995 NCAA Division I Men's Ice Hockey Tournament.

Conference standings
Note: GP = Games played; W = Wins; L = Losses; T = Ties; SW = Shootout Wins; PTS = Points; GF = Goals For; GA = Goals Against

Bracket

Teams are reseeded after the quarterfinals

Note: * denotes overtime period(s)

Play-In

(8) Boston College vs. (9) Massachusetts

Quarterfinals

(1) Maine vs. (9) Massachusetts

(2) Boston University vs. (7) Merrimack

(3) New Hampshire vs. (6) Providence

(4) Northeastern vs. (5) Massachusetts-Lowell

Semifinals

(1) Maine vs. (6) Providence

(2) Boston University vs. (5) Massachusetts-Lowell

Consolation

(1) Maine vs. (5) Massachusetts-Lowell

Championship

(2) Boston University vs. (6) Providence

Tournament awards

All-Tournament Team
F Shawn Bates (Boston University)
F Brady Kramer (Providence)
F Chad Quenneville (Providence)
D Jon Coleman (Boston University)
D Chris Imes (Maine)
G Bob Bell* (Providence)
* Tournament MVP(s)

References

External links
Hockey East Online

Hockey East Men's Ice Hockey Tournament
HE tournament